The Enniskillen and Bundoran Railway (E&BR) was an Irish gauge  railway company in north-west Ireland. The line was opened in 1868 and closed in 1957.

Development

Construction began in 1866 and the section between Bundoran Junction and Bundoran opened in 1868. The Irish North Western Railway (INW), which since 1866 had worked the L&ER, also provided the train service on the E&BR.

The E&BR renamed itself the Enniskillen, Bundoran and Sligo Railway in anticipation of its extension to Sligo. This would have given stations on the E&BR a direct main line link with Dublin via the MGW instead of the INW's indirect and rather meandering route to Dundalk where it connected with the Dublin and Drogheda Railway’s main line to the city. It would also have enabled the E&BR to carry substantial cattle traffic from the west of Ireland to the north-east, both for domestic consumption in and around Belfast and for export to Scotland and England.

In 1878 the E&BR obtained an Act allowing it to abandon its extension to Sligo, and the SL&NCR opened in phases between 1879 and 1883.

The SL&NCR adopted as its company seal a picture of two steam locomotives colliding, with one derailed and the other remaining on the track. This commemorated the SL&NCR's success in reaching Sligo and the E&BR's failure to do the same. The SL&NCR route attracted the cattle traffic to the east coast but it was too circuitous to carry much of the passenger traffic to Bundoran, Ballyshannon or Lough Derg. This was to the permanent disadvantage of both the SL&NCR and the E&BR.

Under the Great Northern Railway
In 1876 the INW merged with the Northern Railway of Ireland and the Ulster Railway to form the Great Northern Railway (GNR), which continued the INW's undertaking to work the E&BR. The GNR absorbed the E&BR in 1896. At first the GNR did not operate through trains between Bundoran and Dublin. However, by 1916 the GNR ran the Great Northern Hotel at Bundoran and was running through coaches that were attached a main line train between Dublin and Dundalk and to an INW line train between Dundalk and Enniskillen.

The partition of Ireland in 1922 turned the boundary between counties Donegal and Fermanagh into an international frontier. This imposed three border crossings on the E&B line: one each side of Pettigo and a third just west of Belleek. It also placed a border crossing on the road between Pettigo and the pilgrims’ destination of Lough Derg. Partition also imposed a border crossing on the SL&NCR — a fate that would not have befallen the E&BR's proposed line between Bundoran and Sligo if it had been built.

Stops for customs examinations delayed trains for unpredictable lengths of time, which added to the E&B line's existing disadvantage of circuitous connections to the centres of trade and population on Ireland's east coast. Growing road transport was able to take more direct routes with which GNR trains found it increasingly difficult to compete.

The E&B line had five intermediate stations between Bundoran Junction and Bundoran. In Fermanagh the GNR added four railmotor halts to the line and in 1934 it introduced a railcar to serve all stations between Enniskillen and Bundoran, including the railmotor halts. The railcar was a great success, covering between eight and 12 miles per gallon of fuel and costing only 4d per mile to run — far less than an equivalent steam train.

During The Emergency the GNR introduced the seasonal Bundoran Express, one of Ireland's relatively few named trains. It was not a fast train but it was a through service via Dundalk between Dublin Amiens Street station and Bundoran.

The Second World War created new traffic for the GNR in Northern Ireland. Fuel rationing in the UK impeded road competition in Northern Ireland from 1939, and was further tightened from 1942. Many passengers and GNR staff exploited shortages and rationing of commodities in the UK by smuggling goods across the border from the Republic into the UK. On one occasion in July 1942, when the 17:00 departure from Bundoran to Belfast reached the border it was detained so long while customs officers searched its passengers that it was 04:00 the next morning that it reached .

After the war the GNR's fortunes declined again. In 1953 the governments of Northern Ireland and the Republic jointly nationalised the ailing company as the GNR Board.

Nationalisation and closure
In 1957 the Northern Ireland Government made the GNR Board close all its lines across or near the border except the Dublin – Belfast main line and its branch to Newry. Lines including the Enniskillen and Bundoran, the Dundalk and Enniskillen and the Omagh – Enniskillen section of the Londonderry and Enniskillen were closed on 1 October 1957. Closure of these lines and the Northern Ireland government's withdrawal of grant aid gave the SL&NCR no option but to close as well.

The closures conceded holiday traffic to Bundoran and Ballyshannon to road competition, but the railway strove to retain pilgrim traffic to Lough Derg. The Bundoran Express was replaced by a service from Dublin via  and the Portadown, Dungannon and Omagh Junction Railway (PD&O) to Omagh in Northern Ireland, which then became the railhead for Lough Derg. In 1958 the Irish Republic and Northern Ireland dissolved the GNR Board and divided its assets between Córas Iompair Éireann and the Ulster Transport Authority. However, CIÉ continued the pilgrim service to Omagh until 1964. In February 1965 the UTA closed the PD&O as recommended by the Benson Report of 1963.

References

Sources and further reading

Railway companies established in 1862
Railway companies disestablished in 1896
Irish gauge railways
Great Northern Railway (Ireland)
Closed railways in Ireland
Closed railways in Northern Ireland
Transport in County Donegal
Transport in County Fermanagh
Railway lines opened in 1868
1862 establishments in Ireland